Blue Glacier is in the  U.S. state of Washington. The much larger Chickamin Glacier is on the west side of Gunsight Peak.

See also
List of glaciers in the United States

References

Glaciers of the North Cascades
Glaciers of Chelan County, Washington
Glaciers of Washington (state)